La Ferté-Saint-Samson is a commune in the Seine-Maritime department in the Normandy region in northern France.

Geography

Population

Places of interest
 The motte and ruins of a feudal castle.
 An old house dating from the sixteenth century.
 A nineteenth-century château.
 The thirteenth-century chapel of St.Samson.
 The church of St.Pierre, dating from the tenth century.

See also
Communes of the Seine-Maritime department

References

Communes of Seine-Maritime